The , also known as Mainichi Film Award for Best Foreign Film, is an award given annually at the Mainichi Film Awards to recognize the best foreign films produced outside Japan. It was first presented in 1984, with Sophie's Choice being the first recipient of the award.

Winners

1980s

1990s

2000s

2010s

2020s

References

External links
 

Awards established in 1983
1983 establishments in Japan
Foreign Film
Lists of films by award
Film awards for Best Foreign Language Film